Test cricket is the oldest form of cricket played at international level. A Test match is scheduled to take place over a period of five days, and is played by teams representing full member nations of the International Cricket Council (ICC). Bangladesh became a full-member in 2000 after playing their first Test match against India at the Bangabandhu National Stadium. They have played a total of 131 matches.

Key
The top five records are listed for each category, except for the team wins, losses, draws and ties and the partnership records. Tied records for fifth place are also included. Explanations of the general symbols and cricketing terms used in the list are given below. Specific details are provided in each category where appropriate. All records include matches played for Australia only, and are correct .

Team records

Overall Record

Team wins, losses, draws and ties
, Bangladesh played 136 Test matches resulting in 16 victories, 102 defeats and 18 draws for an overall winning percentage of 11.76.

First Test series wins

First Test match wins

Team scoring records

Most runs in an innings
The highest innings total scored in Test cricket came in the series between Sri Lanka and India in August 1997. Playing in the first Test at R. Premadasa Stadium in Colombo, the hosts posted a first innings total of 6/952d. This broke the longstanding record of 7/903d which England set against Australia in the final Test of the 1938 Ashes series at The Oval. The first Test of the 2012–13 series against the Sri Lanka saw Bangladesh set their highest innings total of 638.

Highest successful run chases

Bangladesh's highest successful run chase in Test cricket came in the 2nd Test of the 2009 Series at Grenada. Bangladesh reached the target of 215 runs with four wickets in hand

Fewest runs in an innings
The lowest innings total scored in Test cricket came in the second Test of England's tour of New Zealand in March 1955. Trailing England by 46, New Zealand was bowled out in their second innings for 26 runs. The lowest score in Test history for Bangladesh is 43 scored in their first innings against West Indies in the first Test of the Bangladesh in the West Indies in 2018.

Most runs conceded in an innings
The highest innings total scored against Bangladesh is by Sri Lanka when they scored 730/6d in the first Test of the Sri Lanka's tour of Bangladesh in 2014 at Sher-e-Bangla National Stadium.

Fewest runs conceded in an innings
The lowest innings total scored against Bangladesh is 111 by West Indies in the second Test of West Indies tour of Bangladesh in 2018

Result records
A Test match is won when one side has scored more runs than the total runs scored by the opposing side during their two innings. If both sides have completed both their allocated innings and the side that fielded last has the higher aggregate of runs, it is known as a win by runs. This indicates the number of runs that they had scored more than the opposing side. If one side scores more runs in a single innings than the total runs scored by the other side in both their innings, it is known as a win by innings and runs. If the side batting last wins the match, it is known as a win by wickets, indicating the number of wickets that were still to fall.

Greatest win margins (by innings)

Greatest win margins (by runs)

Greatest win margins (by wickets)

Narrowest win margins (by runs)

Narrowest win margins (by wickets)

Greatest loss margins (by innings)

Greatest loss margins (by runs)

Greatest loss margins (by wickets)

Narrowest loss margins (by runs)

Narrowest loss margins (by wickets)

Individual records

Batting records

Most career runs
A run is the basic means of scoring in cricket.

Most runs in each batting position

Most runs against each team

Highest individual score

Highest individual score against each team

Highest individual score – progression of record

Highest career average
A batsman's batting average is the total number of runs they have scored divided by the number of times they have been dismissed.

Highest average in each batting position

Most half-centuries
A half-century is a score of between 50 and 99 runs. Statistically, once a batsman's score reaches 100, it is no longer considered a half-century but a century.

Most centuries
A century is a score of 100 or more runs in a single innings.

Most double centuries
A double century is a score of 200 or more runs in a single innings.

Most Sixes

Most Fours

Most runs in a series

Most ducks
A duck refers to a batsman being dismissed without scoring a run. Glenn McGrath has scored the equal third-highest number of ducks in Test cricket behind Courtney Walsh with 43 and Chris Martin with 36.

Bowling records

Most career wickets 
A bowler takes the wicket of a batsman when the form of dismissal is bowled, caught, leg before wicket, stumped or hit wicket. If the batsman is dismissed by run out, obstructing the field, handling the ball, hitting the ball twice or timed out the bowler does not receive credit.

Most wickets against each team

Best figures in an innings 
Bowling figures refers to the number of the wickets a bowler has taken and the number of runs conceded.

Best bowling figures against each team

Best figures in a match 
A bowler's bowling figures in a match are the sum of the wickets taken and the runs conceded over both innings.

Best career average 
A bowler's bowling average is the total number of runs they have conceded divided by the number of wickets they have taken.

Best career economy rate 
A bowler's economy rate is the total number of runs they have conceded divided by the number of overs they have bowled.

Best career strike rate 
A bowler's strike rate is the total number of balls they have bowled divided by the number of wickets they have taken.

Most five-wicket hauls in an innings 
A five-wicket haul refers to a bowler taking five wickets in a single innings.

Most ten-wicket hauls in a match 
A ten-wicket haul refers to a bowler taking ten or more wickets in a match over two innings.

Worst figures in an innings

Worst figures in a match

Most wickets in a series

Hat-trick 
In cricket, a hat-trick occurs when a bowler takes three wickets with consecutive deliveries. The deliveries may be interrupted by an over bowled by another bowler from the other end of the pitch or the other team's innings, but must be three consecutive deliveries by the individual bowler in the same match. Only wickets attributed to the bowler count towards a hat-trick; run outs do not count.
In Test cricket history there have been just 44 hat-tricks, the first achieved by Fred Spofforth for Australia against England in 1879. In 1912, Australian Jimmy Matthews achieved the feat twice in one game against South Africa. The only other players to achieve two hat-tricks are Australia's Hugh Trumble, against England in 1902 and 1904, Pakistan's Wasim Akram, in separate games against Sri Lanka in 1999, and England's Stuart Broad.

Wicket-keeping records
The wicket-keeper is a specialist fielder who stands behind the stumps being guarded by the batsman on strike and is the only member of the fielding side allowed to wear gloves and leg pads.

Most career dismissals
A wicket-keeper can be credited with the dismissal of a batsman in two ways, caught or stumped. A fair catch is taken when the ball is caught fully within the field of play without it bouncing after the ball has touched the striker's bat or glove holding the bat, while a stumping occurs when the wicket-keeper puts down the wicket while the batsman is out of his ground and not attempting a run.

Most career catches

Most career stumpings

Most dismissals in an innings

Most dismissals in a match

Most dismissals in a series

Fielding records

Most career catches

Most catches in a match

Most catches in a series

All-round records

1000 runs and 100 wickets
A total of 71 players have achieved the double of 1000 runs and 100 wickets in their Test career.

Other records

Most career matches

Most matches as captain

Youngest players

Oldest players on debut

Oldest players

Partnership records
In cricket, two batsmen are always present at the crease batting together in a partnership. This partnership will continue until one of them is dismissed, retires or the innings comes to a close.

Highest partnerships by wicket 
A wicket partnership describes the number of runs scored before each wicket falls. The first wicket partnership is between the opening batsmen and continues until the first wicket falls. The second wicket partnership then commences between the not out batsman and the number three batsman. This partnership continues until the second wicket falls. The third wicket partnership then commences between the not out batsman and the new batsman. This continues down to the tenth wicket partnership. When the tenth wicket has fallen, there is no batsman left to partner so the innings is closed.

Highest partnerships by runs

Umpiring records

Most matches umpired
An umpire in cricket is a person who officiates the match according to the Laws of Cricket. Two umpires adjudicate the match on the field, whilst a third umpire has access to video replays, and a fourth umpire looks after the match balls and other duties. The records below are only for on-field umpires.

Aleem Dar of Pakistan holds the record for the most Test matches umpired with 132, . The current active Dar set the record in December 2019 overtaking Steve Bucknor from the West Indies mark of 128 matches. They are followed by South Africa's Rudi Koertzen who officiated in 108. The most experienced Bangladeshi is Sharfuddoula.

See also

 List of Bangladesh One Day International cricket records
 List of Bangladesh Twenty20 International cricket records

Notes

References

Test
Bangladesh